was the 81st emperor of Japan, according to the traditional order of succession. His reign spanned the years from 1180 through 1185.

During this time, the Imperial family was involved in a bitter struggle between warring clans. Minamoto no Yoritomo with his cousin Minamoto no Yoshinaka, led a force from the Minamoto clan against the Taira, who controlled the emperor. During the climactic sea Battle of Dan-no-ura in April 1185, Antoku's grandmother Taira no Tokiko took him and plunged with him into the water in the Shimonoseki Straits, drowning the child emperor rather than allowing him to be captured by the opposing forces.

The conflict between the clans led to numerous legends and tales. The story of Emperor Antoku and his mother's family became the subject of the Kamakura period epic poem The Tale of the Heike (Heike is an alternative reading of the Japanese characters for "House of the Taira"). Antoku's tomb is said to be located in a number of places around western Japan, including the island of Iwo Jima, a result of the spreading of legends about the emperor and the battle.

Genealogy
Before his ascension to the Chrysanthemum Throne, his personal name (his imina) was Tokohito-shinnō (言仁親王).  He was also known as Kotohito-shinnō.

His father was Emperor Takakura, and thus a grandson of retired Emperor Go-Shirakawa.  His mother, Taira no Tokuko (平徳子), second daughter of Taira no Kiyomori (平清盛), was later referred to as Empress Dowager Kenrei (建礼門院, Kenrei-mon In).

Events of Antoku's life 
Antoku was named crown prince at around one month of age.  He ascended the throne at the age of two.  Naturally, he held no actual power, but rather his grandfather Taira no Kiyomori ruled in his name, though not officially, as sesshō (regent).

 1180 (Jishō 4, 21st day of the 4th month): In the 12th year of Takakura-tennōs reign (高倉天皇十二年), the emperor was forced to abdicate; and the succession (‘‘senso’’) was received by his infant son, the grandson of Taira Kiyomori.  Shortly thereafter, Emperor Antoku is said to have acceded to the throne (‘‘sokui’’).

In the year of his enthronement, the capital was moved to modern-day Kōbe, Hyōgo, but it was soon moved back to Heian-kyō.

 1183 (Juei 2, 20th day of the 8th month): Go-Toba is proclaimed emperor by the Minamoto; and consequently, there were two proclaimed emperors, one living in Heian-kyō and another in flight towards the south.

In 1183, when Minamoto no Yoshinaka entered the capital, the Taira clan fled with the young emperor and the sacred treasures to Yashima (the name of a place inside modern-day Takamatsu, Kagawa).  Being defeated in ensuing battle, they fled westward.

 1185 (Genryaku 2, 24th day of the 3rd month): The Taira and the Minamoto clashed in the Battle of Dan-no-ura.

The Taira were defeated.  Antoku's grandmother, Taira no Tokiko, Kiyomori's widow, drowned herself along with the young emperor.  His mother also drowned herself, but apparently, according to The Tale of the Heike (Heike Monogatari), she was pulled out with a rake by her long hair.

According to Yoshitsune's dispatch, the sacred seal was found, but the sacred sword was lost.  The sword was one of the three sacred treasures.

Kugyō
Kugyō (公卿) is a collective term for the very few most powerful men attached to the court of the Emperor of Japan in pre-Meiji eras.

In general, this elite group included only three to four men at a time.  These were hereditary courtiers whose experience and background would have brought them to the pinnacle of a life's career.  During Antoku's reign, this apex of the Daijō-kan included:
 Sesshō, Konoe Motomichi, 1160–1233.
 Udaijin
 Nadaijin, Taira Munemori, 1147–1185.
 Dainagon

Memorial site
After his drowning, in order to mourn the body and placate any restless spirits, the Amidaji Goeidō was built.  Later, Antoku was enshrined at the Kurume-Suitengū in Kurume, Fukuoka, and he came to be worshipped as Mizu-no-kami (水の神, lit. "water-god" or "god of water"), the god of easy delivery at Suitengū (水天宮, lit. "water-heaven/emperor-shrine") everywhere.

With the establishment of Shintō as the state religion of Japan, the Amidaji Temple was abandoned and the Akama Shrine was established in Shimonoseki in Yamaguchi prefecture to celebrate Antoku.

The Imperial Household Agency designates Amida-ji no misasagi (阿彌陀寺陵) near Akama Shrine in Shimonoseki as Antoku's tomb.

Eras of Antoku's reign
The years of Antoku's reign are more specifically identified by more than one era name or nengō.
 Jishō  (1177–1181)
 Yōwa  (1181–1182)
 Juei       (1182–1184)
 Genryaku   (1184–1185)
 Bunji      (1185–1190)

Ancestry

Popular Culture
 In manga and anime Angolmois: Record of Mongol Invasion, he was said to survive, and he's Teruhi's great-grandfather. He met Jinzaburo Kuchii, a formerly samurai under Hojo disgraced in an incident and exiled to Tsushima Island to help the people there repel a joint Mongol Empire-Yuan Dynasty-Goryeo armies.

See also
 Emperor of Japan
 List of Emperors of Japan
 Imperial cult
 Akama Shrine (Akama jingū)
 Emperor Bing of Song, a child emperor who was also forced to commit suicide in a naval battle
 Shimonoseki City Information Mentions death of Emperor Antoku following the battle of Dan No Ura

Notes

References
 Brown, Delmer M. and Ichirō Ishida, eds. (1979).  Gukanshō: The Future and the Past. Berkeley: University of California Press. ; OCLC 251325323
 Helmolt, Hans Ferdinand and James Bryce Bryce. (1907). The World's History: A Survey of Man's Progress. Vol. 2.  London: William Heinemann.OCLC 20279012
 Kitagawa, Hiroshi and Burce T. Tsuchida, ed. (1975). The Tale of the Heike. Tokyo: University of Tokyo Press.  OCLC 164803926
 Ponsonby-Fane, Richard Arthur Brabazon. (1959).  The Imperial House of Japan. Kyoto: Ponsonby Memorial Society. OCLC 194887
 Titsingh, Isaac. (1834). Nihon Odai Ichiran; ou,  Annales des empereurs du Japon.  Paris: Royal Asiatic Society, Oriental Translation Fund of Great Britain and Ireland. OCLC 5850691
 Varley, H. Paul. (1980). Jinnō Shōtōki: A Chronicle of Gods and Sovereigns. New York: Columbia University Press. ; OCLC 59145842
 According to Shimonoseki City Information: "In the Middle Age, the last battle between the Genji clan and the Heike clan broke out in Dannoura on 24 March 1185 and Yoshitsune won the battle by using the tides."

1178 births
1185 deaths
12th-century Japanese monarchs
Japanese emperors
Deaths by drowning
Child monarchs from Asia
Monarchs who died as children
People of Heian-period Japan
Heian period Buddhist clergy
Deified Japanese people
Japanese Buddhist monarchs